Seán Mac Stíofáin (born John Edward Drayton Stephenson; 17 February 1928 – 18 May 2001) was an English-born chief of staff of the Provisional IRA, a position he held between 1969 and 1972.

Childhood
Although he used the Gaelicised version of name in later life, Mac Stíofáin was born John Edward Drayton Stephenson in Leytonstone, London, in 1928. An only child, his father was an English solicitor's clerk and his mother a Londoner of Ulster Protestant east Belfast descent. He stated his mother had left an impression on him at the age of seven with her instruction:

"I'm Irish, therefore you're Irish… Don't forget it."

His childhood was marred by his alcoholic father. His mother, who doted over her son, died when Mac Stíofáin was 10. Mac Stíofáin attended Catholic schools, where he came into contact with pro-Sinn Féin Irish students.

He left school in 1944 at the age of 16 and worked in the building trade, before being conscripted into the Royal Air Force in 1945.  He attained the rank of corporal. After leaving the RAF, he returned to London where he became increasingly involved with Irish organisations in Britain. He first joined Conradh na Gaeilge (Gaelic League), then the Irish Anti-Partition League, bought (and later sold) the United Irishman, joined Sinn Féin in London, and eventually in 1949 helped to organise a unit of the IRA. He first met his wife, Máire, who was from Castletownroche, County Cork. Mac Stíofáin then began work for British Rail.

Joining the IRA
On 25 July 1953, Mac Stíofáin took part in an IRA arms raid on the armoury of the Officers' Training Corps at Felsted School in Essex. The IRA netted over 108 rifles, ten Bren and eight Sten guns, two mortars and dummy mortar bombs in the raid. The police seized the van carrying the stolen weapons some hours later, due to it being so overloaded that it was going at about 20 mph on the Braintree bypass with a queue of traffic behind it. On 19 August 1953, he was sentenced, along with Cathal Goulding and Manus Canning, to eight years' imprisonment by a court in Bishop's Stortford, Hertfordshire. It was in the run-up to the raid that Mac Stíofáin learned his first few words of Irish from Cathal Goulding. He later became fluent in the language.

While incarcerated in Wormwood Scrubs and Brixton prisons, he learned not only a smattering of Greek from the Cypriot EOKA prisoners (he befriended Nikos Sampson) but also "the realities of an anti-British rule guerrilla campaign".

Upon being granted parole in 1959, Mac Stíofáin went to the Republic of Ireland with his wife and young family and settled in Dublin, and later Navan, and became known under the Irish version of his name. Contrary to a number of accounts, this was not his first visit to the country, and he had been to Ireland a month before the Felsted raid in 1953. He worked as a salesman for an Irish-language organisation. He remained active in the IRA and gave the Bodenstown oration in 1959. A staunch and lifelong Catholic, he was uneasy with the left-wing political direction – under way from 1964 – his erstwhile friend and IRA chief of staff, Cathal Goulding, was bringing to the IRA. Appointed IRA director of intelligence in 1966, Mac Stíofáin continued to voice his opposition to the Goulding line and was gaining support among members. Despite his hostility to the left-wing direction, he was prominent in agitations in Midleton against ground-rent landlordism, the Dublin Housing Action Committee and against foreign buy-outs of Irish farmland in County Meath, where he moved with his family in 1966.

A tall, well-built man, Mac Stíofáin was regarded as a rather stoic personality who did not drink or smoke. He was a devout Catholic and was infuriated by an article in the United Irishman, by Roy Johnston, condemning the reciting of the Rosary at republican commemorations as "sectarian". For refusing to distribute the newspaper, he was suspended from the IRA for six months.

Leading the Provisional IRA
When an IRA special army convention voted to drop the principle of abstentionism in December 1969, a troika comprising Mac Stiofáin, Dáithí Ó Conaill and Seamus Twomey together with others established themselves as a "Provisional Army Council" in anticipation of a contentious 1970 Sinn Féin Árd Fheis. At this, the Marxist leadership of Sinn Féin failed to attain the prerequisite two-thirds majority necessary to overturn the party's constitutional opposition to "partitionist" assemblies. This was despite the disbandment of pro-abstentionist branches and district committees, such as the 1966 dissolution of the entire North Kerry Comhairle Ceantair of Sinn Féin, embracing 13 cumainn (branches) and 250 members and including three local councillors and expulsion of leading figures such as May Daly (sister of Charlie Daly, executed at Drumboe, Donegal, in 1923), John Joe Rice, Sinn Féin TD from 1957 to 1961 and John Joe Sheehy, veteran republican and Kerry footballer. Many others were similarly ousted from the organisation. The underlying issue was the uncompromising stand of Kerry in refusing recognition to Westminster, Leinster House and Stormont.

Mac Stiofáin was subsequently appointed the chief of staff of the Provisional Army Council. At the Sinn Féin Árd Fheis in Dublin on 10 January 1970, Mac Stíofáin declared from the podium that he pledged his "allegiance to the Provisional Army Council" before leading the walkout of disgruntled members to form what would become Provisional Sinn Féin. The split also ended Mac Stíofáin's friendship with Cathal Goulding, who went on to serve as chief of staff of the rival Official IRA. Although both had been good personal friends before the split, Goulding was later scathing about "that English Irishman".

The "Provisional Army Council" in the coming months would command the loyalty of the IRA national organisation, save for a few isolated instances (that of the IRA Company of the Lower Falls Road, Belfast, under the command of Billy McMillen, and other small units in Derry, Newry, Dublin and Wicklow). Mac Stiofáin's men soon came to be known as the Provisional IRA.

Nicknamed "Mac the Knife", Mac Stíofáin was a dedicated "physical-force" republican who believed that violence was the only means to bring about an end to Northern Ireland's status as part of the United Kingdom. In his autobiography, he set out the aims of the Provisional IRA as moving from "area defence" to "combined defence and retaliation" and then a "third phase of launching an all-out offensive action against the British occupation system". He also gave a detailed account of his development of the tactic of the "one-shot sniper". He is said to have taken part in an unsuccessful attack on Crossmaglen RUC station in August 1969.

His military strategy was summed up in his own words by "escalate, escalate, escalate", and in 1972, by far the bloodiest year of the conflict, the IRA killed around 100 British soldiers and lost 90 of their own members.

On 7 July 1972, Mac Stíofáin led an IRA delegation to a secret meeting with members of the British government, led by Secretary of State for Northern Ireland William Whitelaw, at Cheyne Walk in London. Other IRA leaders in attendance were Dáithí Ó Conaill, Martin McGuinness, Gerry Adams, Seamus Twomey and Ivor Bell. Leading the delegation, Mac Stíofáin spelled out the three basic demands of the Provisionals:
(1) The future of Ireland to be decided by the people of Ireland acting as a unit;
(2) a declaration of intent by the British government to withdraw from Northern Ireland by January 1975; and
(3) the unconditional release of all political prisoners.

The British claimed this was impossible owing to the commitment it had given to unionists. The talks ended in failure, and as a briefing for prime minister Edward Heath later noted, Whitelaw "found the experience of meeting and talking to Mr Mac Stíofáin very unpleasant". Mac Stíofáin said that Whitelaw put up his bluff exterior at first, but after a couple of minutes let it drop and showed himself to be a shrewd political operator; he also noted that Whitelaw was one of the few Englishmen to pronounce his name correctly.

Following the unsuccessful talks, Mac Stíofáin ordered an intensification of the IRA campaign which peaked on 21 July 1972, or Bloody Friday, when the IRA detonated 22 car bombs in less than two hours across Belfast, killing nine people and injuring 130. In his memoirs, Mac Stíofáin described the operation as "a concerted sabotage offensive" intended to demonstrate the IRA was capable of planting a large number of bombs at once.

At a meeting between Heath and Irish Taoiseach Jack Lynch in Munich on 4 September 1972, the former asked the latter if Mac Stíofáin could be arrested. In reply, Lynch said that he couldn't as the evidence against him was flimsy and he had a high degree of public support.

On 19 November 1972, a controversial interview with Mac Stíofáin was broadcast on the RTÉ This Week radio programme. He was arrested on the same day and the interview was later used as evidence against him on a trial of IRA membership, and on 25 November he was sentenced to six months' imprisonment by the Special Criminal Court in Dublin. Political fallout arising from the interview was considerable and some days later, Fianna Fáil minister Gerry Collins sacked the entire RTÉ authority.

Jailed in the Curragh prison, Mac Stíofáin immediately embarked on a hunger and thirst strike. He was taken to the Dublin Mater Hospital, from where an IRA unit, including two members disguised as priests, unsuccessfully tried to free him on 26 November 1972. After this, he was transferred to the Military Hospital of the Curragh, in County Kildare.  He ended his thirst strike on 28 November. His hunger strike led to tumultuous scenes in Dublin and protests outside the Mater Hospital, where he was visited by the then Catholic archbishop of Dublin, Dermot Ryan, and his predecessor, John Charles McQuaid.

After 57 days, he was ordered off his protest by the IRA Army Council for "bringing the IRA into disrepute". Some have reported that council members Ruairí Ó Brádaigh and Dáithí Ó Conaill ordered him off the strike.  However, Ó Brádaigh, by this time, had also been arrested. In fact, when he was transferred into the Glasshouse of the Curragh, Ó Brádaigh welcomed him.

Following standard procedures, Mac Stíofáin lost his rank upon arrest and he never again regained his influence within the IRA after his release in April 1973.

Later life
Afterwards he was sidelined, and was given a job of distribution manager and part-time columnist with the Sinn Féin newspaper, An Phoblacht, in the late 1970s. He resigned from the party in 1982 after a disagreement about strategy at the Ard Fheis, when a majority opposed the Éire Nua policy, which envisaged the setting up of regional governments in each of the traditional four provinces on the island.

In the late 1970s he met with representatives from the Army Council of the Irish National Liberation Army who were interested in him becoming Chief of Staff of that movement, but nothing ever came from the meetings.

In March 1983 Mac Stíofáin appealed to the IRA to declare a ceasefire.

In the 1980s and 1990s, Mac Stíofáin became active in the Irish-language organisation Conradh na Gaeilge. At that organisation's centenary celebration held in Dublin's O'Connell Street in 1993, he was a guest of honour on the platform. He remained a member of the standing committee (Coiste Gnó) of Conradh na Gaeilge until his death. He lived in the Meath Gaeltacht. Visitors to his home were greeted at the front door with a mat saying Labhair Gaeilge Anseo ("Speak Irish here").

Death
In 1993, Mac Stíofáin suffered a stroke. On 18 May 2001, he died in Our Lady's Hospital in Navan, County Meath, after a long illness at the age of 73. He is buried in St Mary's Cemetery, Navan.

Despite his controversial career in the IRA, many of his former comrades (and rivals) paid tribute to him after his death. Ruairí Ó Brádaigh, who attended the funeral, issued a glowing tribute, referring to Mac Stíofáin as an "outstanding IRA leader during a crucial period in Irish history" and as the "man for the job" as first Provisional IRA chief of staff. Gerry Adams and Martin McGuinness also attended. In her oration, Ita Ní Chionnaigh of Conradh na Gaeilge, whose flag draped the coffin, lambasted Mac Stíofáin's "character assassination" by the "gutter press" and praised him as a man who had been "interested in the rights of men and women and people anywhere in the world who were oppressed, including Irish speakers in Ireland, who are also oppressed".

Notes and references

Writings
Mac Stíofáin, Seán, Memoirs of a Revolutionary, London (Gordon Cremonesi), 1975. Also published as Revolutionary in Ireland

Sources
 Hunter, John (20 May 2001). "Death of the Englishman who led the Provisionals", The Observer. Retrieved 6 August 2021.
 "Sean MacStiofain dead, founded Provisional IRA", Irish Echo Online, 23–29 May 2001  
 "Adams and IRA's secret Whitehall talks", BBC News, 1 January 2003, 
 RTÉ This Week radio interview: 
 "Outstanding IRA leader and giant of a man in the Republican Movement", Saoirse, June 2001.
  Ó Brádaigh, Ruairí. "Seán Mac Stíofáin – a tribute", Saoirse, June 2001.
 Interview with Mac Stíofáin (likely taken from Peter Taylor's Provos series). Contains details on Cheyne Walk talks here.
 Hanley, Brian, and Millar, Scott (2009). The Lost Revolution: The Story of the Official IRA and the Workers' Party. Dublin: Penguin Ireland.

1928 births
2001 deaths
Irish people of English descent
Irish Republican Army (1922–1969) members
Irish republicans imprisoned by non-jury courts
People from Leytonstone
Provisional Irish Republican Army members
Republicans imprisoned during the Northern Ireland conflict
Irish hunger strikers
Conradh na Gaeilge people